The Luckiamute River is a tributary of the Willamette River, about  long, in western Oregon in the United States. It drains an area of Central Oregon Coast Range and the western Willamette Valley northwest of Corvallis.

It flows southeast to Hoskins in Benton County, then northeast into Polk County, past Pedee, then east across southern Polk County. It is joined from the northwest by the Little Luckiamute River.

Named tributaries from source to mouth are Boulder, Beaver, Miller, Wolf, Rock Pit, Slick, Cougar, Slide, and Harris creeks. Further downstream are Hull, Foster, Jones, Bonner, Vincent, Plunkett, and Price creeks. Maxfield Creek is next followed by Bump, Ritner, Pedee, McTimmonds, Link, Dry, and Jont creeks followed by the Little Luckiamute River. Soap Creek enters the main stem along the Luckiamute's lower reaches.

The Luckiamute Watershed Council includes Ash Creek in its watershed study area, although it drains directly into the Willamette River.

See also
List of rivers of Oregon
List of longest streams of Oregon

References

External links
Luckiamute Watershed Council

Tributaries of the Willamette River
Rivers of Polk County, Oregon
Rivers of Benton County, Oregon
Rivers of Oregon
Oregon placenames of Native American origin